United Nations Security Council resolution 598 S/RES/0598 (1987), (UNSC resolution 598) adopted unanimously on 20 July 1987, after recalling Resolution 582 and 588, called for an immediate ceasefire between Iran and Iraq and the repatriation of prisoners of war, and for both sides to withdraw to the international border. The resolution requested the Secretary-General to dispatch a team of observers to monitor the ceasefire while a permanent settlement was reached to end the conflict. It became effective on 8 August 1988, ending all combat operations between the two countries and the Iran–Iraq War. Khomeini had been quoted about his opinion on the ceasefire where he stated "Happy are those who have departed through martyrdom. Unhappy am I that I still survive.… Taking this decision is more deadly than drinking from a poisoned chalice. I submitted myself to Allah's will and took this drink for His satisfaction" after announcing that Iran had signed a ceasefire with Iraq (20 July 1988).

After acceptance of Resolution 598
Both Iran and Iraq had accepted Resolution 598 on 20 July 1988.

Both sides eventually withdrew to the international border in the coming weeks, with Resolution 598 becoming effective on 8 August, ending all combat operations between the two countries. UN peacekeepers belonging to the UNIIMOG mission took the field, remaining on the Iran–Iraq border until 1991.

See also 
 Iran–Iraq relations
 Iran–Iraq War
 List of United Nations Security Council Resolutions 501 to 600 (1982–1987)
 Resolutions 479, 514, 522, 540, 552, 582, 612, 616, 619 and 620

References

External links 

 Text of the Resolution at United Nations Digital Library

 0598
 0598
1987 in Iran
1987 in Iraq
July 1987 events